Tito Claudio Traversa (April 22, 2001 – July 5, 2013) was a 12-year-old Italian climber who died of complications from a climbing accident in which he fell from a 50 feet (15 m) to the ground on July 5, 2013. An investigation by French officials revealed that his quickdraws were  assembled incorrectly, with the carabiners threaded only through the rubber keeper, and not through the full-strength sewn loop at the ends of the quickdraws that are designed to support the climber's weight. According to public prosecutor Raffaele Guariniello, eight out of ten of Traversa’s quickdraws were assembled this way. 

Five people have been charged with manslaughter in the case. Among those charged is the owner of the company that produced the rubber keepers without instructions, as well as the owner of the gear shop that sold the keepers. The manager of the club that organized the climbing trip, as well as two of the instructors who were at the climbing site, have also been charged for failing to check the safety of the equipment.

On May 16, 2018, the court of Turin imposed two years of imprisonment on the boy's instructor. The owner of the climbing school and the entrepreneur from Bergamo who produced a small part of the equipment were absolved.

References

External links 
 
 Images demonstrating the incorrect assembly of the equipment which led to Traversa's death

2013 in France
Deaths by person in France
Mountaineering deaths
Sport deaths in France